The Sydney Stars is a former Australian rugby union football team that competed in the National Rugby Championship (NRC) in 2014 and 2015. The Stars team was established as a joint venture between the Sydney University and Balmain rugby clubs, and was one of four New South Wales teams in the competition.

The NRC was launched in 2014, reinstating the national competition after an absence of six years. Sydney University was initially interested in entering the NRC competition as a stand-alone club, but submitted a joint bid with Balmain as the Sydney Stars.

Colours and logo
The Sydney Stars' colours of gold, blue and black was drawn from the rugby clubs of Sydney University and Balmain. The team logo was the name "Sydney" in blue capitals outlined in white above the name "Stars" in gold capitals outlined in blue, and with the central letter "A" formed as the top point of a large stylised five-pointed star. The entire design was outlined in black.

History
The previous national competition was the Australian Rugby Championship (ARC), which was discontinued in 2007 after only one season. After setting up a consultative process in 2006 which culminated in a working session of some 70 delegates from around the country, the Australian Rugby Union announced that a new eight-team national competition would commence in 2007. New South Wales was allocated three teams and it was decided that representative teams would be formed to play out of the Central Coast, Western Sydney, and Sydney. The decision was controversial because two New South Wales clubs, Sydney University and Randwick, had wanted to enter stand-alone teams in the new competition.

Sydney Fleet (ARC team)

The Sydney Fleet was formed as one of three New South Wales teams to participate in the ARC. The Fleet's colors were blue and gold, the same colours used by past teams representing all of Sydney. The team's local rivals were the Western Sydney Rams and Central Coast Rays.

The logo of the Sydney Fleet featured a traditional anchor, similar to that on the Coat of arms of Sydney. The name, logo and team colours were revealed at the official launch of the team held aboard the museum ship HMAS Vampire at the Australian National Maritime Museum, in Darling Harbour on 27 February 2007.

Existing clubs aligned with the Sydney Fleet included Sydney University, Randwick, Eastern Suburbs and Southern Districts. The team played at North Sydney Oval which was also the home ground of the Northern Suburbs Rugby Club, although that club was aligned with the Central Coast Rays team for the ARC competition.

Head coach of the Sydney Fleet was Col "Snake" Jeffs, who was also the NSW Country head coach at the time. Former Wallaby and Waratah Scott Bowen (Easts head coach) and former Waratah and Italy Test lock Mark Giacheri (Randwick head coach) were the assistant coaches. Tim Davidson was the captain.

The Australian Rugby Championship was terminated at the end of 2007 after only one season of competition, with the Australian Rugby Union citing higher costs than budgeted and further projected financial losses. The Sydney Fleet team was disbanded with the end of the ARC competition.

National Rugby Championship
In December 2013, the ARU announced that the national competition was to be relaunched, with the National Rugby Championship (NRC) commencing in 2014. Expressions of interest were open to any interested parties, with the accepted bids finalised in early 2014. The Sydney University initially expressed interest in entering the NRC competition as a stand-alone club. However, a joint venture between Sydney University and Balmain rugby club (run by Sydney businessman Warren Livingstone, founder of the sports-tourism group Fanatics) was successful. On 24 March 2014 it was announced that the Sydney Stars team would play in the NRC competition.

Sydney University's coach Chris Malone was named as the head coach of the Sydney Stars for 2014, with Cameron Blades as forwards coach and Peter Playford as backs coach. Jack Farrar and Matt Dunning were appointed as support personnel. Pat McCutcheon was named as captain. Peter Playford became the head coach in 2016 and David Hickey was named captain. The team finished fourth in the regular season and played  in a semifinal but lost by 47–32.

In 2016, the two-year licence for the Sydney Stars team to play in the NRC was not renewed, as the ARU had adjudged that the player talent available was not sufficient to support four competitive teams in New South Wales.

Stadium
The home ground for the Sydney Stars was Leichhardt Oval, the long-term home of rugby league team, the Balmain Tigers and its descendant team the Wests Tigers playing in the NRL competition. The ground has primarily hosted rugby league and association football teams over the years.

Records

Honours
National Rugby Championship
Playoff appearances: 2015

Season standings
National Rugby Championship
{| class="wikitable" style="text-align:center;"
|- border=1 cellpadding=5 cellspacing=0
! style="width:20px;"|Year
! style="width:20px;"|Pos
! style="width:20px;"|Pld
! style="width:20px;"|W
! style="width:20px;"|D
! style="width:20px;"|L
! style="width:20px;"|F
! style="width:20px;"|A
! style="width:30px;"|+/-
! style="width:20px;"|BP
! style="width:20px;"|Pts
! style="width:25em; text-align:left;"|  Play-offs
|- align=center
|align=left|2015
|align=left|4th
|| 8 || 4 || 0 || 4 || 241 || 314 || −73 || 4 || 20
|align=left|  Semi-final loss to Brisbane City by 47–32.
|- align=center
|align=left|2014
|align=left|9th
|| 8 || 1 || 1 || 6 || 211 || 356 || −145 || 1 || 7
|align=left|  Did not compete
|}

Australian Rugby Championship (Sydney Fleet)
{| class="wikitable" style="text-align:center;"
|- border=1 cellpadding=5 cellspacing=0
! style="width:20px;"|Year
! style="width:20px;"|Pos
! style="width:20px;"|Pld
! style="width:20px;"|W
! style="width:20px;"|D
! style="width:20px;"|L
! style="width:20px;"|F
! style="width:20px;"|A
! style="width:30px;"|+/-
! style="width:20px;"|BP
! style="width:20px;"|Pts
! style="width:25em; text-align:left;"|  Play-offs
|- align=center
|align=left|2007
|align=left|5th
|| 8 || 4 || 0 || 4 || 212 || 244 || −32 || 4 || 20
|align=left|  Did not compete
|}

Head coaches
 Peter Playford (2015)
 Chris Malone (2014)
 Col "Snake" Jeffs (2007 – Syd. Fleet)

Captains
 David Hickey (2015)
 Pat McCutcheon (2014)
 Tim Davidson (2007 – Syd. Fleet)

Squads

{| class="collapsible collapsed" style=" width: 100%; margin: 0px; border: 1px solid darkgray; border-spacing: 3px;"
|-
! colspan="10" style="background-color:#f2f2f2; cell-border:2px solid black; padding-left: 0.25em; padding-right: 1em; text-align: center;" |2015 Sydney Stars squad – NRC
|-
| colspan="10"|The squad for the 2015 National Rugby Championship season:

|-
| width="3%"| 
| width="30%" style="font-size: 95%;" valign="top"|

Props
 Alasdair King
 Tomas Robertson
 Liam McGrath
 Alastair Ryan
 Paddy Ryan
 Matthew Sandell
 Jeremy Tilse

Hookers     
 Tom Coolican
 James Hanson
 Tolu Latu

Locks
 David Dennis
 Loma Kaveinga     
 Mathew Philip     
 Rohan O'Regan     
 Will Skelton1

| width="3%"| 
| width="30%" style="font-size: 95%;" valign="top"|

Loose Forwards
 Ofa Finau
 David Hickey (c)
 Andrew Leota
 Pat McCutcheon  
 Declan Moore
 Jake Wainwright
 Mitchell Whiteley

Scrum-halves
 Richard Draper
 Jake Gordon
 Nick Phipps1
 Theo Strang

Fly-halves   
 Bernard Foley1
 Ben Hughes
 Jordan McGregor

| width="3%"| 
| width="30%" style="font-size: 95%;" valign="top"|

Centres
 Tom Carter
 John Hale
 Andrew Robinson
 Tom Kingston
 
Wingers
 Henry Clunies-Ross
 Harry Jones 
 Jim Stewart 
 Christian Yassmin

Fullbacks
 Israel Folau1
 Guy Porter
 Angus Roberts
1. Test player outside of the contracted squad.
|}

{| class="collapsible collapsed" style=" width: 100%; margin: 0px; border: 1px solid darkgray; border-spacing: 3px;"
|-
! colspan="10" style="background-color:#f2f2f2; cell-border:2px solid black; padding-left: 0.25em; padding-right: 1em; text-align: center;" |2014 Sydney Stars squad – NRC
|-
| colspan="10"|The squad for the 2014 National Rugby Championship season:

|-
| width="3%"| 
| width="30%" style="font-size: 95%;" valign="top"|

Props
 Alasdair King
 Tomas Robertson
 Paddy Ryan
 Matthew Sandell
 Jeremy Tilse
 Michael Tyler
 Laurie Weeks

Hookers
 Tom Coolican
 Folau Fainga'a
 Tolu Latu
 James Willan

Locks
 Jordan Chapman
 Byron Hodge
 Loma Kaveinga
 Matt Philip
 Will Skelton1
 Ryan Wilson

| width="3%"| 
| width="30%" style="font-size: 95%;" valign="top"|

Loose Forwards
 Hugo Dessens
 David Hickey
 Tipiloma Kaveinga
 Pat McCutcheon (c)
 Benn Melrose
 Samuel Quinn
 Mitchell Whiteley

Scrum-halves
 Jake Gordon
 Jock Merriman
 Nick Phipps1
 Angus Pulver

Fly-halves
 Stuart Dunbar
 Bernard Foley1
 Daniel Kelly

| width="3%"| 
| width="30%" style="font-size: 95%;" valign="top"|

Centres
 Tom Carter
 Johnathan Fakai
 Michael Hodge
 Finau Makamaka
 James McMahon

Wingers
 Peter Betham
 Henry Clunies-Ross
 James Dargaville
 Matthew Kenny
 Jim Stewart
 Jonny Loseli

Fullbacks
 Israel Folau1
 Angus Roberts

1. Test player outside of the contracted squad.
|}

{| class="collapsible collapsed" style=" width: 100%; margin: 0px; border: 1px solid darkgray; border-spacing: 3px;"
|-
! colspan="10" style="background-color:#f2f2f2; cell-border:2px solid black; padding-left: 0.25em; padding-right: 1em; text-align: center;" |2007 Sydney Fleet squad – ARC
|-

| width="3%"| 
| width="30%" style="font-size: 95%;" valign="top"|

Props
Sean Baker (Randwick)
Dayna Edwards (Randwick) 
Jeremy Tilse (Sydney Uni)
Laurie Weeks (Sydney Uni)

Hookers
Atonio Halangahu (Randwick)
Daniel Lewinski (Sydney Uni)
Todd Pearce (Eastwood)
Sam Zlatevski (Easts)

Locks
Adam Byrnes (Easts)
Ed Brenac (Easts)
Will Caldwell (Sydney Uni)

Matthew Whittleston (Randwick)

| width="3%"| 
| width="30%" style="font-size: 95%;" valign="top"|

Back row
Tim Davidson (Sydney Uni)
Chris Houston (Randwick)
Pat McCutcheon (Sydney Uni)
Dean Mumm (Sydney Uni)

Halfbacks
James Price (Randwick)
Nathan Sievert (Sydney Uni)
Josh Valentine (Manly)

Flyhalves

Danny Kroll (Randwick)

| width="3%"| 
| width="30%" style="font-size: 95%;" valign="top"|

Centres
Morgan Turinui (Randwick)
Tom Azar (Easts)
Tom Carter (Sydney Uni)

Wings

Andrew Barrett (Souths)
Anton La Vin (Easts)
Junior Puroku (Easts)
Filipo Toala (Eastwood)

Fullbacks
Gavin Debartolo (Easts)
Arthur Little (Randwick)
|}

Gallery

See also

New South Wales Rugby Union (NSWRU)
New South Wales Waratahs
Shute Shield
Sydney Uni Football Club
Balmain Rugby Club

References

External links

National Rugby Championship
Rugby union teams in Sydney
Rugby clubs established in 2014
2014 establishments in Australia
Sports clubs disestablished in 2015
2015 disestablishments in Australia